Air Chief Marshal Harsha Abeywickrema, RWP, RSP, VSV, USP, rcds, psc, qfi  (born 28 November 1960) is a senior Sri Lankan air force officer and fighter pilot, who served as the Commander of the Sri Lankan Air Force from 2012 to 2014 and later went on to serve as the Chairman of the Bank of Ceylon.

Early life and education 
Abeywickrema was born on 28 November 1960. He was educated at Royal College Colombo. He later gained a MA degree in International Studies from King's College London, and a MSc degree in Management from the General Sir John Kotelawala Defence University.

SLAF career
Abeywickrema joined the Sri Lanka Air Force as an Officer Cadet in the General Duties Pilot Branch in 1980. After successful completion of Flying Training he was commissioned as a Pilot Officer in 1982. In the early 1980's the Sri Lanka Air Force had only two air squadrons, a fixed wing squadron and a rotary wing squadron, its fighter aircraft had been retired. With the escalation of the Sri Lankan Civil War, air force operations increased. Flying Officer Abeywickrema who flew transport aircraft was transferred to fly light attack  turboprop aircraft SIAI-Marchetti SF.260. He also qualified as a Qualified Flying Instructor (QFI).  

In the late 1980s the Sri Lanka Air Force felt the need to reintroduce jet fighters to its fleet having retired its last jet fighters in the late 1970's. Lacking jet qualified pilots, Squadron leader Abeywickrema who had experience on light attack aircraft was selected as the first commanding officer of the No. 5 "Jet" Squadron, when it was formed in 1991under his command following the acquisition of F-7 and F-5 fighters from China, it was the country's first fighter squadron. He was one of the first pilots to qualify in F-7s in 1991 and became the first SLAF pilot to fly supersonic. He led the first sorties over LTTE controlled areas soon after they introduced MANPADS and the shoot-down two of two Avro 748 killing over 100 military personnel including the SLAF Northern Zonal Commander, Wing Commander Roger Weerasinghe and Wing Commander Shirantha Goonatilake in April 1995.

He was instrumental in selecting the IAI Kfirs for the SLAF, which he qualified in 1996. Having attended the Air Command and Staff College, Air University; he was appointed Commandant of the No. 1 Flying Training Wing and went on to serve as the Commanding Officer of SLAF Palaly, Base Commander of SLAF China Bay, SLAF Anuradhapura and SLAF Rathmalana following which he became the Zonal Commander East and Chief Instructor of Air Wing of the Defence Services Command and Staff College. He graduated from Royal College of Defence Studies.  

At the Air Force Headquarters, he was appointed to the Air Force Board of Management as the Director Operations in year 2006 and thereafter as the Director Air Operations. He was subsequently appointed as the Deputy Chief of Staff whilst continuing as the Director Air Operations in year 2008, and in year 2011 he was entrusted to overlook the duties of the Director Logistics in addition to his appointment as the Deputy Chief of Staff.  

At the Air Force Headquarters, Air Commodore Abeywickrama was appointed to the Air Force Board of Management as the Director Operations in 2006 and thereafter served a stint as the Director Air Operations at SLAF Colombo where he spearheaded air operations that brought about the successful conclusion of the Sri Lankan Civil War in 2009. In 2008, he was appointed Deputy Chief of Staff and promoted to the rank of Air Vice Marshal, while serving as Director Air Operations and in 2011 was given the role of Director Logistics while serving as the Deputy Chief of Staff. In February 2011, he was appointed Commander of the Air Force having been promoted to the rank of Air Marshal. In 2014 he retired from the Air Force and was promoted to the rank of Air Chief Marshal.  

Air Chief Marshal Abeywickrema has been awarded the gallantry medals Rana Wickrama Padakkama and Rana Sura Padakkama for combat bravery, the service medals Vishista Seva Vibhushanaya, Uttama Seva Padakkama and Sri Lanka Armed Services Long Service Medal.

Later work
After his retirement from the Air Force, Abeywickrema was appointed as the Chairman of the largest state bank, Bank of Ceylon.

Family
Abeywickrama is married to Neelika a lawyer and they have one son, Kasun. He is an active golfer.

References

External links
Official Website of Sri Lanka Air Force
Sri Lanka Air Force Commander

 

Commanders of the Sri Lanka Air Force
Sri Lankan Air Chief Marshals
Sinhalese military personnel
Sri Lankan aviators
Alumni of Royal College, Colombo
Alumni of King's College London
Alumni of General Sir John Kotelawala Defence University
Graduates of the Royal College of Defence Studies
Air Command and Staff College alumni
Sri Lanka Air Force Academy graduates
1960 births
Living people